Grace Gao (born October 17, 1989) is a Chinese-born Canadian female badminton player from Calgary, Alberta. She began playing the sport in her hometown Beijing, and became a naturalized citizen of Canada in 2009, after immigrating with her parents at age 14. She competed at the 2012 Summer Olympics in the Mixed doubles event with partner Toby Ng.

References

External links
Badminton Canada profile PDF

1989 births
Living people
Badminton players at the 2010 Commonwealth Games
Badminton players at the 2011 Pan American Games
Badminton players at the 2012 Summer Olympics
Badminton players from Beijing
Canadian female badminton players
Canadian sportspeople of Chinese descent
Chinese emigrants to Canada
Chinese female badminton players
Commonwealth Games competitors for Canada
Olympic badminton players of Canada
Pan American Games gold medalists for Canada
Pan American Games bronze medalists for Canada
Pan American Games medalists in badminton
Sportspeople from Beijing
Sportspeople from Calgary
Medalists at the 2011 Pan American Games